Muzaffargarh Tehsil, is a tehsil (an administrative subdivision) of Muzaffargarh District that falls in DG Khan Division, in the Punjab province of Pakistan.

Administration
The tehsil of Alipur is administratively subdivided into 35  Union Councils.
These are Ahmed Mohana, Aludaywall, Baseera (Muzaffargarh), Basti Karak, Brahimwall, Chak Ferazi, Darain, Ganga, Garey Wahin, Ghazanfargarh, Gul Wala, Jaggatpur, Karamdad Qureshi, Khangarh, Khanpur Shumali, Lutkaran, M.Garh City No.1, M.Garh City No.2, M.Garh City No.3, Manika Bhutta, Mehra Sherqi, Mgarh City No.4, Minkpur, Muradabad, Nohanwali, Rangpur, Rohillanwali, Shah Jamal, Sharif Chajrah, Taleeri, Thatha Qureshi, Umer pur Janubi, Usman Koria, Uttra Sindeela and Wah Pitafi.

References

Tehsils of Punjab, Pakistan